Brahim Nekkach (born February 15, 1982) is a Moroccan footballer currently playing for Renaissance Zemamra as a defensive midfielder. He also has eight caps for the Moroccan national team and captained them in international matches.

Honours 
ASFAR
Coupe du Trône
Winner: 2009

DHJ
Coupe du Trône
Winner: 2013

Wydad Casablanca
Botola
Winner: 2015, 2017, 2019
CAF Champions League
Winner: 2017, runner-up: 2018–19
CAF Super Cup
Winner: 2018

References

1982 births
Living people
Moroccan footballers
Footballers from Casablanca
Wydad AC players
Difaâ Hassani El Jadidi players
AS FAR (football) players
Moghreb Tétouan players
Botola players
Morocco international footballers
Association football midfielders
Renaissance Club Athletic Zemamra players
2016 African Nations Championship players
Morocco A' international footballers